The Diavik Diamond Mine is a diamond mine in the North Slave Region of the Northwest Territories, Canada, about  northeast of Yellowknife.

Description
Diavik Diamond Mine is an industrial complex set in a remote, subarctic landscape. It consists of four kimberlite pipes associated with the Lac de Gras kimberlite field and is located on an island  in Lac de Gras informally known as East Island.

In the 2015 satellite image below, one can see the two main open pits, waste rock pile, and an airstrip capable of landing aircraft as large as 737s and C-130s. The complex also houses processing, power and boiler plants, fuel tanks, water and sewage processing facilities, maintenance shop, administrative buildings, and accommodations for workers. It is connected to points south by an ice road and Diavik Airport with a  gravel runway regularly accommodating Boeing 737 jet aircraft.

Commercial importance
The mine is owned by a joint venture between the Rio Tinto Group (60%) and Dominion Diamond Corporation (40%), and is operated by Yellowknife-based Diavik Diamond Mines Inc., a subsidiary of Rio Tinto Group. Commercial production commenced in 2003, and the lifespan of the mine is expected to be 16 to 22 years. It has become an important part of the regional economy, employing 1,000, and producing approximately 7 million carats of diamonds annually.

History
The area was surveyed in 1992 and construction began in 2001, with production commencing in January 2003. In 2006, the ice road from Yellowknife to the Diavik mine, and neighbouring mines, froze late and thawed early.
The Diavik mine was unable to truck in all the supplies needed for the rest of 2006 before the road closed and arrangements had to be made to bring the remainder of the supplies in by air. Subsequent annual ice road resupply has been completed as planned.

On July 5, 2007, a consortium of seven mining companies, including Rio Tinto, announced they are sponsoring environmental impact studies to construct a deep-water port in Bathurst Inlet.
Their plans include building a  road connecting the port to their mines. The port would serve vessels of up to 25,000 tonnes.

In March 2010, underground mining began at the mine. The transition from open pit to underground mining was completed in September 2012.

In September 2012, Diavik completed construction of the Northwest Territories' first large scale wind farm. The four turbine, 9.2 megawatt facility provides 11 per cent (2015) of the Diavik mine's annual power needs and operates at 98% availability. Diavik operates the world's largest wind diesel hybrid power facility at its remote off-grid mine.

In 2015, $US350 million was announced to fund development of a fourth kimberlite pipe ore body, known as A21. Construction of the A21 rockfill dike (like the other three ore bodies, A21 kimberlite pipe is under shallow waters of Lac de Gras) is expected to be complete in 2018 with first diamonds expected in the fall of that year. To build the dike, Diavik will use the same technologies as were used to build the A154 and A418 dikes.

In December 2015, Rio Tinto announced discovery of the 187.7 carat Diavik Foxfire diamond, one of the largest rough gem quality diamonds ever produced in Canada. The Diavik Foxfire was bestowed an indigenous name, Noi?eh Kwe, which, in the Tlicho First Nation language means caribou crossing stone.

In October 2018, a yellow diamond of 552 carat was found at the mine. This is the largest diamond ever found in North America.

See also
Ekati Diamond Mine
Snap Lake Diamond Mine

References

External links

1991 Discovery of Diamonds in the Northwest Territories
Photos of Diavik Mine at Google Images

2003 establishments in the Northwest Territories
Diamond mines in Canada
Diatremes of the Northwest Territories
Mines in the Northwest Territories
Open-pit mines
Pre-Holocene volcanoes
Rio Tinto (corporation) subsidiaries
Surface mines in Canada